"Love Isn't Easy (But It Sure Is Hard Enough)" is a country rock song recorded by Swedish pop group ABBA. It was the fifth single to be released from their album Ring Ring, but unusually, it was not issued in ABBA's home-country of Sweden, but elsewhere in Scandinavia. It was coupled with "I Am Just a Girl" as its B-side upon release in 1973. The song was one of the last songs to be recorded for the album Ring Ring.

The song describes the common phenomenon of a quarrel between lovers, and although the song's title seems to be self-contradictory, it's unlikely that it pertains to a sexual double entendre as some have believed it to be.

History
The song was written and composed by Benny Andersson & Björn Ulvaeus. All four members of the ABBA share the lead vocals.

Track listing
 "Love Isn't Easy (But It Sure Is Hard Enough)"
 "I Am Just a Girl"

Chart performance
The single's limited release did not generate a Top 10 chart placement anywhere, though it was a minor hit in some countries where it was released.  In Sweden, it reached #3 on the Tio i Topp singles chart, even though it wasn't issued as a single in that country.

References 

1973 singles
ABBA songs
Polar Music singles
Songs written by Benny Andersson and Björn Ulvaeus